Ethmia brevistriga is a moth in the family Depressariidae. It is in California, United States.

The ground color of the forewings is dark brown; with a distinct white line. The ground color of the hindwings is dark brown, but the costal area is paler. Subspecies aridicola has a darker ground color owing to a reduction of the whitish overscaling, especially on the costal half. Adults are on wing from March to mid-May.

The larvae feed on Phacelia distans. Subspecies aridicola only feeds on Phacelia distans var. australis.

Subspecies
Ethmia brevistriga brevistriga (along the immediate coastal strand in central California)
Ethmia brevistriga aridicola Powell, 1973 (inland California)

References

Moths described in 1950
brevistriga